The 2010 Vuelta a España is the 65th edition of Vuelta a España, one of cycling's Grand Tours. This Vuelta features 22 cycling teams. Seventeen of the teams invited to the Vuela are a part of the UCI ProTour, the other five teams are Professional Continental teams. The Vuelta will begin in Seville on August 28 and finish on in Madrid on September 19.

2009 Vuelta champion Alejandro Valverde is under suspension, and is thus not part of the field. Bib number one will be worn by 's Íñigo Cuesta, a gesture by the race organizers to commemorate his record-breaking 17th consecutive appearance in the race.

Startlist
As of August 27, 2010

By Team

By rider

References

2010 Vuelta a España
2009